Oleg Nikolayevich Fatun (born 11 November 1959) is a Russian former track and field sprinter. He won bronze medals in the 4×100 metres relay at the Goodwill Games in 1990 and 1994. He also represented Russia at the 1993 World Championships in Athletics and 1994 European Athletics Championships, as well as having represented the Soviet Union at the 1990 European Athletics Championships.

Along with his teammates, he set the Russian records in the 4×100 metres relay, 4×200 metres relay and indoor 4×200 metres relay which are still unbeaten (as of 2015).

References

External links 

Goodwill Games Official website

1959 births
Living people
People from Rostov Oblast
Sportspeople from Rostov Oblast
Soviet male sprinters
Russian male sprinters
Universiade bronze medalists for the Soviet Union
Universiade medalists in athletics (track and field)
Medalists at the 1987 Summer Universiade
Goodwill Games medalists in athletics
Competitors at the 1990 Goodwill Games
Competitors at the 1994 Goodwill Games
World Athletics Championships athletes for Russia
Russian Athletics Championships winners